Irving Thomas (born January 2, 1966) is a retired American professional basketball player born in Brooklyn, New York, formerly of the National Basketball Association (NBA). He spent most of his career playing in Europe in several countries.

A 6'8" small forward from the University of Kentucky and Florida State University played with the Los Angeles Lakers during the 1990-91 NBA season, appearing in 26 games, averaging 1.8 points and 1.4 rebounds per game. Since 2001, he has been a scout for the Lakers.

Notes

External links
NBA stats @ basketballreference.com
Irving Thomas stats @ Lega Basket Serie A

1966 births
Living people
American expatriate basketball people in France
American expatriate basketball people in Greece
American expatriate basketball people in Italy
American expatriate basketball people in Spain
American men's basketball players
Basket CRO Lyon players
Basket Livorno players
Birmingham Bandits players
CB Gran Canaria players
CB Peñas Huesca players
Dinamo Sassari players
Florida State Seminoles men's basketball players
Fort Wayne Fury players
Kentucky Wildcats men's basketball players
Lega Basket Serie A players
Liga ACB players
Los Angeles Lakers players
McDonald's High School All-Americans
Olimpia Basket Pistoia players
Pallacanestro Trieste players
Pallacanestro Virtus Roma players
P.A.O.K. BC players
Parade High School All-Americans (boys' basketball)
Rapid City Thrillers players
Small forwards
Sportspeople from Brooklyn
Undrafted National Basketball Association players

Basketball players from New York City